Annie M. Aggens (also known as Annie Aggens)  is a polar expedition leader for Polar Explorers. She is one of only a few women who have led treks to both the North and South Poles.

In May 2008, she led an international team on a 25-day trek across the Greenland Ice Cap. She is also the co-author, with Chris Townsend, of the Encyclopedia of Outdoor & Wilderness Skills: The Ultimate A-Z Guide for The Adventurous. 2003. Ragged Mountain Press. .

In 2006, she founded ICECAAP, an international consortium of polar explorers dedicated to preserving the polar environment.

References

Sources 

 Townsend, Chris, and Annie M Aggens. Encyclopedia of Outdoor & Wilderness Skills. Ragged Mountain Press/McGraw Hill, 2003.

Year of birth missing (living people)
Living people
21st-century American non-fiction writers
21st-century American women writers
American nature writers
Women science writers
American women non-fiction writers